Infanta Isabel of Coimbra (Isabella of Portugal) (1 March 1432 – 2 December 1455) was a Portuguese infanta and Queen of Portugal as the first spouse of King Afonso V of Portugal.

Life 
Isabella was a daughter of the Infante Peter, Duke of Coimbra, and Isabella of Aragon, Countess of Urgel. Her paternal grandfather was King John I of Portugal and her maternal grandfather was James II, Count of Urgel.

Queen
Isabella's father was the regent for her cousin Afonso V during his minority. Reportedly, Isabella and Afonso fell in love with each other. They were engaged in 1445, which caused a conflict between Peter of Coimbra and Duke Afonso of Braganza, who had wished for the monarch to marry his grandchild. Isabella was given the income of Santarém, Alvaiázere, Sintra and Torres Vedras at her wedding.

Isabella and Afonso V were married on 6 May 1447. Both the bride and groom were fifteen. 

In 1448, the king took Afonso of Braganza as his advisor. Isabella's father died (suspected to have been killed), and her brother John was exiled. Isabella herself did not fall out of favour with the king, however, and she took control of the duchy of Coimbra until her brother returned to Portugal in 1454. 

In 1455, Isabella had her father honoured with a grand ceremony of exoneration at court and had him re-buried in a grand way. Shortly after this, she died at age twenty-three, possibly from poisoning.

Issue 
Isabella had three children:

John, Prince of Portugal (29 January 1451)
Joan, Princess of Portugal (6 February 1452 – 12 May 1490): Known as Saint Joan of Portugal or Saint Joan Princess. Beatified in 1693 by Pope Innocent XII.
John II of Portugal (3 March 1455 – 25 October 1495): Succeeded his father as 13th King of Portugal.

Ancestry

References

External links
 Genealogical Information on Isabel of Coimbra (in Portuguese)

1432 births
1455 deaths
House of Aviz
Portuguese infantes
Portuguese queens consort
15th-century Portuguese people
15th-century Portuguese women